Viridian Housing was a housing association that provided social housing to over 30,000 people in the south of England and the Midlands. Viridian was an exempt charity and a registered Community Benefit Society.

Important People 
Nick Apetroaie – Chief Executive

Nick was recruited into the permanent role of Chief Executive in October 2015. Prior to this Nick held the same role for 16 month as Viridian’s Interim CEO. With 20 years of experience in the housing and care sector, Nick joined Viridian in 2008 as the Director of Care and, in 2011; he was appointed the Director of Property, responsible for Maintenance, Reinvestment, Asset Management and Development.

Nick also sits on the Board of Radian Support and Ungureni Trust charity. He is married, with two children and lives in West London.

Nick A web

Matt Campion – Director of Operations

Matt is currently our Director of Operations, overseeing Housing, Social Impact, Commercial Operations, Customer Service and Legal. He previously held the role of Social Impact Director. Matt joined Viridian in April 2005 through the association’s merger with Riverhaven. He had worked as the director for care and support and previously as a Supported housing manager for Riverhaven.

Matt has also worked for a specialist BME housing association, large RSLs and local authorities. Before working in housing Matt worked as a lecturer in psychology.

Matt C web

Iain Bacon – Director of Finance

Iain is a Chartered Accountant with extensive experience from a number of senior roles in the Public, Private and Not-for Profit sectors. Previous roles include pricing major bids and working as a Management Consultant for Capita, Director of Finance and Infrastructure for Centrex (a Police training and development agency), and interim roles which include setting up a Shared Service Centre in South Wales for Reliance Security. Iain has considerable property experience and worked for the Guinness Partnership prior to joining Viridian.

Iain B web

Neal Ackcral – Director of Property Services

Neal is a member of the Chartered Institute of Building and has over 24 years of senior management experience within the Property Sector. Neal has extensive experience of setting up and establishing a number of successful maintenance teams and direct labour organisations within the housing sector.

Neal joined Viridian in 2006. He was appointed Head of Reinvestment in April 2012 and was instrumental in assisting the Reinvestment team to obtain the Best National In-house Maintenance Provider Award in 2014 from the National Housing Maintenance Forum (NHMF).

Neal A web

Kerry Tromanhauser – Director of Governance and Assurance

Kerry qualified a barrister and a solicitor and worked in the private and public sectors in Canada before immigrating to the U.K. in 2004. Following two governance related roles in the social housing sector, he joined Viridian Housing in November 2011 in the newly created Head of Governance role.

In addition to his Viridian duties, Kerry is a reservist in the field of Media Operations with the Royal Navy and recently deployed in support of current operations in 2014.

Kerry T web

Chris Miller – Director of Development and Commercial Projects

Chris is a member of the Chartered Institute of Housing and has worked in the affordable housing sector for 27 years and in Development for the last 17 years. He joined Viridian in 2007 as Head of Business Development focussing initially on developing our Retirement village programme before becoming Head of Development and Sales in 2012 with responsibility for our whole development programme.

He has been integral in securing multimillion-pound investment and development opportunities for Viridian with major house builders and developing successful relationships with some of our key stakeholders.

Chris is also a board member of St. Basils, a small Birmingham based Housing Association who specialise in housing homeless young people.

References

External links 

Housing associations based in England
Housing in England
Charities based in London